Sandy Bar may refer to:

 Sandy Bar, Manitoba, Canada
 Sandy Bar (actress) (born 1976), Israeli actress and model

See also
 Sandy Barr